Alexandra Hollá (born 24 October 1994) is a Slovak footballer who plays as a midfielder and has appeared for the Slovakia women's national team. Currently works at NKIM.

Career
Hollá has been capped for the Slovakia national team, appearing for the team during the 2019 FIFA Women's World Cup qualifying cycle.

References

External links
 
 
 

1994 births
Living people
Slovak women's footballers
Slovakia women's international footballers
Women's association football midfielders
ŠK Slovan Bratislava (women) players